Sjohnna McCray (born 1972) is an American poet. He is the author of Rapture, winner of the Walt Whitman award of the Academy of American Poets in 2015.

Biography
Sjohnna McCray was born in Cincinnati, Ohio, on March 7, 1972. He earned a BS from Ohio University in 1995, and later obtained a MFA in Poetry from the University of Virginia.

McCray published his first poetry collection, Rapture (Graywolf Press) in 2016. The collection was chosen by United States Poet Laureate, Tracy K. Smith, as the winner of the 2015 Walt Whitman Award.  Smith writes of the collection: "These poems are so beautifully crafted, so courageous in their truth-telling, and so full of what I like to think of as lyrical wisdom—the visceral revelations that only music, gesture and image, working together, can impart—that not only did they stop me in my tracks as a judge, but they changed me as a person."

McCray was the recipient of Ohio University's Emerson Poetry Prize and was nominated for a Pushcart Poetry Prize. He later studied at Teachers College, Columbia University, where he received an MA in English Education.

McCray has taught school in New York City, Chicago and Phoenix.  He currently lives in Savannah, Georgia, where he teaches English at Savannah State University.

Awards
 Walt Whitman award, Rapture, (2015)
 Nominee Pushcart Prize
 Winner Ohio University's Emerson Poetry Prize

References 

1972 births
Living people
Ohio University alumni
University of Virginia alumni
21st-century American poets
21st-century American male writers
American male poets